KEAE-LP (107.9 FM) is a low-power FM radio station licensed to Eagle, Colorado, United States. The station is currently owned by State of Colorado Telecom Services.

References

External links
 

EAE-LP
EAE-LP